Olalla is an unincorporated settlement in the South Okanagan region of the Southern Interior of British Columbia, Canada, located southwest of Penticton (the nearest large city) and just north of Keremeos. Kaleden, just northeast beyond Olalla along BC Highway 3A, occupies the pass dividing the Okanagan Valley beyond and the Similkameen Country of which Olalla is a part.

Olalla is a retirement community.

School 
The Similkameen Elementary Secondary School in Keremeos serves as the primary education centre for the region.

Name & History
Olalla's name is a local adaptation of the Salish and Chinook word for "berries", a reference to locally abundant Saskatoon berries. The word is listed as olallie or ollalie in many Chinook Jargon lexicons.  Olalla was the site of a mining boom in the 1890s. Briefly it was the bustling centre for several productive mines, but ore deposits did not meet expectations; the town faded and it became a small collection of homes on the highway between Keremeos and Penticton.

See also
List of Chinook Jargon placenames

References

Unincorporated settlements in British Columbia
Populated places in the Similkameen
Ghost towns in British Columbia
Chinook Jargon place names
Designated places in British Columbia
Populated places in the South Okanagan
Populated places in the Okanagan Country